R36 or R-36 may refer to:

Roads 
 R36 road (Belgium)
 R36 (South Africa)

Other uses 
 R36 (airship), a British airship
 R-36 (missile), a family of Soviet intercontinental ballistic missiles
 R36 (New York City Subway car)
 , a destroyer of the Royal Navy
 R36: Irritating to eyes, a risk phrase
 Renard R.36, a Belgian fighter aircraft
 Volkswagen Passat R36, a car